Littleport railway station is on the Fen line in the east of England, serving the village of Littleport, Cambridgeshire. Its three-letter station code is LTP.

The station and most trains calling are operated by Great Northern (with service to and from ), with some additional peak services being operated by Greater Anglia (to and from London Liverpool Street).

Facilities
Littleport station is unstaffed and tickets must be purchased from the self-service ticket machine at the station which has seated areas and customer help points on both platforms.

The station has a small cycle rack at the entrance as well as a small (free) car park which is operated by Saba Parking.

Step-free access is available to both the platforms at Littleport.

Services
Great Northern operate all off-peak services at Littleport using  EMUs.

The typical off-peak service in trains per hour is:
 1 tph to 
 1 tph to 

During the peak hours, additional Great Northern services run to the station as well as a single Greater Anglia service to and from London Liverpool Street.

References

External links 

Railway stations in Cambridgeshire
DfT Category F1 stations
Former Great Eastern Railway stations
Railway stations served by Govia Thameslink Railway
Greater Anglia franchise railway stations
Littleport